Platte County Courthouse may refer to:

Platte County Courthouse (Missouri), Platte City, Missouri
Platte County Courthouse (Nebraska), Columbus, Nebraska
Platte County Courthouse (Wyoming), Wheatland, Wyoming